Rodolphe Albert Millaire, CC, CQ (January 18, 1935 – August 15, 2018) was a Canadian actor and theatre director.

Life
Millaire was born in Montreal. He was raised by a single mother, after his father died when Millaire was less than a year old. He was first inspired to become an actor after seeing Laurence Olivier's 1948 film performance of Hamlet.

Soon after completing his studies at the Conservatoire d'art dramatique de Montréal, Millaire became prominent on the Quebec theatre scene. He was particularly noted in performances in Alfred de Musset's Lorenzaccio, Molière's Tartuffe and Dom Juan, Shakespeare's Hamlet, and Roch Carrier's La céleste bicyclette.

Millaire had worked behind the scenes at Montreal's Théâtre du Nouveau-Monde, and had acted and directed in English at the Stratford Festival of Canada. His notable performances on television include such historical figures as Pierre Le Moyne d'Iberville and Sir Wilfrid Laurier, as well a noted stage performance as Louis Riel. Although acting primarily in French, he was also sometimes seen in English roles, including Adventures in Rainbow Country, By Way of the Stars and Road to Avonlea.

He had been chairman of the Académie québécoise de théâtre and the Canadian Council on the Status of the Artist.

He was married twice, first to Rita Imbault and later to television director Michèle Marchand.

Millaire died of cancer in Montreal on August 15, 2018, aged 83.

Awards and recognition
Officer, Order of Canada, 1989
Companion, Order of Canada, 2001
Knight, National Order of Quebec
Recipient of the Governor General's Performing Arts Award for Lifetime Artistic Achievement, 2006

References

External links

Albert Millaire fonds (R16145) at Library and Archives Canada

1935 births
2018 deaths
French Quebecers
Companions of the Order of Canada
Knights of the National Order of Quebec
Male actors from Montreal
Canadian male stage actors
Governor General's Performing Arts Award winners
Canadian male Shakespearean actors
Canadian male film actors
Canadian male television actors